Odd Georg Sagør (born 2 July 1918 in Meldal, died 24 June 1993) was a Norwegian politician for the Labour Party.

He was Minister of Consumer Affairs and Administration from 1973 to 1976, during the second cabinet Bratteli.

On the local level he was a member of Trondheim city council from 1945 to 1970, serving as deputy mayor from 1959 to 1963 and mayor from 1963 to 1970. 
 
Outside politics he spent most of his career (1936–1970) in Norges Brannkasse. From 1976 to 1986 he was chief administrative officer (rådmann) in Trondheim. He was a member of the board of Arbeideravisa from 1946 to 1959, and of the Norwegian Association of Local and Regional Authorities from 1972 to 1976.

References

1918 births
1993 deaths
People from Meldal
Government ministers of Norway
Mayors of Trondheim
Labour Party (Norway) politicians